The title Hero of the Socialist Republic of Romania was the highest distinction in the Socialist Republic of Romania. It was modeled on the Soviet Union's highest award, the Hero of the Soviet Union title. It was first awarded in 1971 and was awarded for service to the implementation of domestic and foreign policy.

List of recipients (Partial List) 
 Nicolae Ceaușescu  (Politician) 1971, 1978 and 1988 
 Ion Gheorghe Maurer  (Politician) 1972
 Josip Broz Tito  (Politician) 1972
 Juan Perón  (President of Argentina) 1974
 Elena Ceaușescu  (Politician) 1981
 Dumitru Prunariu  (Romanian Cosmonaut) 1981
 Leonid Popov  (Soviet cosmonaut) 1981

References 

Military awards and decorations of Romania
Orders, decorations, and medals of Romania
1971 establishments in Romania
1989 disestablishments in Romania
Socialist Republic of Romania
Hero (title)